Samsung B7300 (marketed as OmniaLITE) is an entry-level Windows Mobile 6.5 smartphone from Samsung and is a part of their Omnia series of mobile phones. Announced in June 2009, the Omnia Lite was launched in June 2009. It is based on the original Omnia and the Tocco Ultra.

References

External links 
Official website
samsung omnia updates

B7300
Mobile phones introduced in 2009
Mobile phones with user-replaceable battery